George Herbert Sallans (April 20, 1895 - November 18, 1960) was a Canadian writer and journalist, whose novel Little Man won the Governor General's Award for English-language fiction and the Ryerson Fiction Award in 1942.

Born and raised in Dufferin County, Ontario, he worked as a journalist for newspapers in Winnipeg, Saskatoon and Vancouver, and as a Canadian correspondent for British United Press before publishing Little Man.

References

External links
 

1895 births
1960 deaths
Canadian newspaper journalists
Canadian male journalists
Canadian male novelists
People from Dufferin County
Writers from Ontario
Governor General's Award-winning fiction writers
20th-century Canadian novelists
20th-century Canadian male writers